
Yujin Point ("Elm-Ferry Cape") is a North Korean headland in the middle of the country's eastern coast along the Sea of Japan. It forms the eastern side of Kimchaek Bay (the former "Songjin" or "Plaksin Bay") in North Hamgyong's Kimchaek County.

Dangerous wrecks lie about half a mile  SSW of the point.

See also
 Yujin Village, its namesake village

References

Citations

Bibliography
 .

External links
 , a topographical map of the area around Yujin Point.

Headlands of North Korea
Landforms of North Hamgyong